Cafarnaum is a municipality in the state of Bahia in the North-East region of Brazil. It was named in tribute to Capernaum (Cafarnaum in Portuguese means Capernaum).

See also
List of municipalities in Bahia

References

Municipalities in Bahia